Yuvabharathi Public School is a co-educational private school in Coimbatore, Tamil Nadu, India. It was established in 2005 and is part of the Bharat Educational Society. It is affiliated to the Central Board of Secondary Education (CBSE).

Academics 
The school provides classes from Kindergarten to Std. XII and prepares students for the CBSE's All India Secondary School Examination and All India Senior School Certificate Examination following the 10 +2 pattern of education. Indian School of Business and Finance (ISBF), New Delhi, and Yuvabharathi Public School have partnership for its Economics, Management and Finance (EMF) Club a first of a kind in India. An initiative to provide students with a platform to learn more about higher studies and careers in the inter-related EMF fields.

Campus 
The School has a 11.236 acre campus with maths, science, computer laboratories, a library also has two organic and herbal gardens, and the unique 5.5-cent Miya Waki forest hosting 234 species of trees. Sports facilities have come up with a multi-sport artificial turf at its campus and its said to be the first of its kind facility among schools in South India. Besides the football and cricketing multisport facility, the synthetic turf also has a six-lane running track.

Extra-curricular activities 
 National Cadet Corps
 The Bharat Scouts and Guides
 School band

Awards and recognition 

British Council International School Award 2015-18

EducationWorld India School Rankings 2016-17

Greenest Campus Award

Best Outstation School Award

Awards for best farming techniques

Economics, Management and Finance (EMF) Club

Awarded Number one Co-ed Day school in Coimbatore by Education World India School Rankings 2020-2021

'Making students experts in All Spheres of Life’ article published in K-12 Magazine

Identified/Recognised as one of the Ten Most Innovative Schools in South India by K-12 Digest (Indian Edition) in April 2021

The government of India's NITI Aayog selected Yuvabharathi Public School to establish Atal Laboratory (ATL)  Yuvabharathi Public school is one of the 257 schools that is selected by the Government of India to establish Atal Tinkering  Laboratory (ATL) under the Atal Innovation Mission (AIM) in 2016.

Mr. Anand Jeyasingh, the ATL in-charge teacher of Yuvabharathi Public School, joined the ATL Wall of Fame in 2020 for his efforts in encouraging students to build a surveillance system. Yuvabharathi Public School got featured on ATL Wall of fame in 2021 for winning multiple titles in coding excellence.

In 2018, Careers360 studied 9000 schools and rated them based on quantifiable parameters like infrastructure, faculty, students, final results, etc. Yuvabharathi Public School gained an AAAA rating (Standing: Best School) among the 3000 schools rated regarding learning outcomes.

CSR Activities 

 Yuvabharathi Public school has been associated with Shanti Ashram (NGO)  and providing organizational support regarding accompanying communities and persons to alleviate poverty, redress inequalities, create leaders and promote sustainable development . 

Students of Yuvabharathi Public School have been regularly participating in ‘Poverty Solutions’ which was initiated by Shanti Ashram (NGO) in 2012 which has nurtured the spirit of charity 
by buying a piggy bank and filling it with savings/ pocket money. 

The contribution from the piggy banks get translated into scholarships for underprivileged children, immunization and anemia screening drives for children and adolescent girls, food banks, and nutritional literacy programmes.

 The students participated in the ‘Standing Up With A Million Indian Children’ campaign, an initiative by Shanti Ashram to ensure the protection of the rights of children and ensure their progress and protection.

 Athishey Kiran and Adarsh got the opportunity to attend GenFest 2012 held in Budapest in recognition of their work at Shanti Ashram with HIV positive children. Swasthika Anand, a Yuvabharathi student,  was one of the three children who represented India at the GNRC (Global Network of Religions for Children)  5th Forum based on the theme: “Ending Violence against Children: Faith Communities in Action” organised by Arigatou International in collaboration with Global Network of Religions for Children members in May 2017 in Panama City, Panama.

Yuvabharathi conducts a Blood donation camp joining hands with the Ganga Hospitals, Coimbatore in the month of August every year since 2014 in commemoration of our Independence Day. The school was honoured with the Design for Change I CAN award in 2014 for this noble initiative taken by the students.

Yuvabharathi has conducted fairs to raise funds during the Pongal festival and contributed the amount to support the Gaja Cyclone relief fund and the education of underprivileged children in 2019 and 2020 respectively.

The students actively participate in SEWA (Social Empowerment through Work Education and Action)  as a part of the CBSE curriculum and complete their projects based on the individual and group social or community service.

The school adopted the nearby village with the objective of spreading awareness regarding food waste and cleanliness. A free medical camp was conducted in this village for the well-being of the women.

The students of the Department of Mass Media Studies of Yuvabharathi Public School organised and conducted MovieZen, an online Film Festival in August 2021. The fund collected through the tickets sold to the school community was donated to Humane Animal Society (HAS), Coimbatore an NGO that provides food, shelter and appropriate rehabilitation to stray animals.

References

External links 
 

Schools in Coimbatore
Private schools in Tamil Nadu
Primary schools in Tamil Nadu
High schools and secondary schools in Tamil Nadu
Educational institutions established in 2005
2005 establishments in Tamil Nadu